Tom Wiscombe (born April 4, 1970, La Jolla, California) is an American architect based in Los Angeles, California. He is the Principal and Founder of Tom Wiscombe Architecture (TWA). Consisting primarily of unbuilt projects, Wiscombe’s work is known for its massing, graphic qualities, and inventiveness, all informed by contemporary ecological thought. His recently released monograph Objects Models Worlds covers his practice and ideas. He was the Chair of the Undergraduate Program at Southern California Institute of Architecture (SCI-Arc), where he  taught for over 15 years.

Career 
Wiscombe began his career as an intern at NASA's Goddard Spaceflight Center, where his father Warren Wiscombe was a Chief Scientist. He completed his B.A. in Architecture at UC Berkeley in 1992 and his master's degree at UCLA in 1999.

Between degrees, from 1993-1998, Wiscombe joined Coop Himmelb(l)au, where he became Design Architect for Principal Wolf Prix. During this time, he designed and built the UFA Cinema Center, Dresden. In 2001, after teaching for 2 years at SCI-Arc under Director Neil Denari, he returned to Coop Himmelb(l)au as Chief Designer and Project Partner to lead several international projects. These include BMW Welt, Munich, the Lyon Musée des Confluences, and the Akron Art Museum,.

In 2006, he established his practice in Los Angeles and returned to SCI-Arc. In 2015, Wiscombe assumed the role of Chair of the B.Arch. Program, which he has reshaped to include a Liberal Arts program intended to disrupt and fuel design thinking. He also hosts a Liberal Arts Masterclass series, intended to bringing intellectual leaders of our time to engage faculty and students. Wiscombe has taught Advanced Research studios as Visiting Professor at U. Penn (PennDesign) since 2013, held the Louis I. Kahn Visiting Assistant Professorship at Yale University in 2012, and was the UC Berkeley Esherick Chair in 2005.

Wiscombe has developed an international reputation through winning competition entries, lectures, exhibitions, and writings. Early in his career, in 2003, Wiscombe won the MoMA/ P.S.1 Young Architect’s award, realizing it in the P.S.1 courtyard to critical acclaim. In 2011, Wiscombe won first place in two competitions for the 2013 Chinese National Games, including a Civic Sports Center and a Judo Arena in Shenyang, and was hired to design the Beijing National Hotel by the Interior Ministry of China. In 2014, Wiscombe won second prize in the international competition for the Kinmen Passenger Service Center, Taiwan. 

In 2014, Wiscombe began planning and design of The Main Museum of Los Angeles Art with Tom Gilmore, the developer known for leading the re-vitalization of downtown Los Angeles. This project engages the deep basements and rooftops of four historical buildings, creating a new form of museum for the art of L.A. In 2016, Wiscombe won, together with Orange Barrel Media and MOCA, the West Hollywood Sunset Spectacular billboard. This project operates as both a contemporary 'belltower' and public space, and combines site-specific art and interactive content with commercial advertising. In 2018, Wiscombe, together with EYRC Architects, designed the concept for Blockchains City for Blockchains, LLC on their  property in Sparks, Nevada. This project envisions a new world built on blockchain technology, allowing for new forms of collaboration, sustainability, and democracy.

In 2019 construction began on Wiscombe’s Dark Chalet, located on Summit Powder Mountain, for the founder of the largest independent solar power developer in the United States. The project is 362% energy positive, using breakthrough residential solar technology. The Dark Chalet received the 2020 AIA LA Next LA Honor Award in the Single-Family Residential category.  Wiscombe’s, Orange Barrel Media Headquarters project, a proposed expansion to Orange Barrel Media’s office space in Columbus, Ohio, also received a Merit Award in the Commercial/Mixed-Use category. The Flat Out Large, a research project completed in 2021, takes on the housing and energy crises of Los Angeles, with a new form of urbanism based on the ecological ideas of large scale indoor-outdoor spaces, shade, adaptive re-use, and inner-city solar fields.

Recognition 
Wiscombe’s work is part of the permanent collections of the FRAC Centre Orleans, the Art Institute of Chicago, MoMA San Francisco, and MoMA New York. Wiscombe won AIA Design Awards for the Kinmen Passenger Service Center in 2014 and the Main Museum in 2015. ICON Magazine, in its May 2009 issue, named Wiscombe one of the “top 20 architects in the world who are making the future and transforming the way we work”.

Wiscombe has been accused of exploiting students and employees. He posted and subsequently removed a "non-apology" apology on Instagram.

Selected Lectures and Texts

Lectures 
 "Duel + Duet: Patrik Schumacher and Tom Wiscombe in conversation", SCI-Arc Lecture Series (2016)
 "Objects, Containers, Worlds", UCLA A.UD Lecture Series (2016)
 "Near Figuration and Strange Containers", Knowlton School OSU Baumer Lecture Series (2015)

Texts 
 "Tom Wiscombe Interviewed by Zachary Tate Porter", SCI-Arc Offramp (2016)
 "The Object Turn: A Conversation", LOG #33 (2015)
 "Towards a Flat Ontology of Architecture", PROJECT Issue 3 (2014)
 "Interview: Subdivisions, Squishing and Objects in Objects", suckerPUNCH (2013)

References

External links
 
 

1970 births
Living people
20th-century American architects
UC Berkeley College of Environmental Design alumni
UCLA School of the Arts and Architecture alumni
21st-century American architects
People from La Jolla, San Diego